Club Deportivo Universidad Técnica de Cotopaxi is a professional Ecuadorian football club based in Latacunga. They currently play in the country's second-level football league—the Serie B—after gaining promotion from the third-level Segunda Categoria, which they won in 2009.

Achievements
Campeonato de Segunda
Winner (1): 2009

External links

Universidad Tecnica De Cotopaxi
Association football clubs established in 2007
2007 establishments in Ecuador